Crapatalus novaezelandiae, is a species of southern sandfish endemic to the Pacific waters around New Zealand.  It occurs in shallow sandy areas, particularly harbours and estuaries.  Its length is up to 45 cm.

References

Leptoscopidae
Endemic marine fish of New Zealand
Fish described in 1861
Taxa named by Albert Günther